Zadok Ben-David (born 1949) is an Israeli artist working in London. He was born in Beihan, Yemen; his family immigrated to Israel when he was an infant. He studied at the Bezalel Academy of Art and Design from 1971 to 1973.  He continued his studies at the University of Reading and Saint Martin's School of Art, where he studied sculpture and later taught, from 1977 to 1982.

In 1988, Ben-David represented Israel in the Venice Biennale.

He has received many awards, including the Grande Biennial Prémio at the XIV Biennale Internacional de Arte de Vila Nova de Cerveira in Portugal in 2007, and the Tel Aviv Museum prize for sculpture 2005.  In 2008, he was commissioned to make a sculpture for the Beijing Olympics.

Since 1980, Ben-David has had more than forty solo exhibitions.  His works are held in the collections of public and private institutions in Europe, East Asia, the United States, Israel and Australia.

Exhibitions
 "Nature Reserve" at the Shirley Sherwood Gallery, Kew Gardens, 2021–22
 "Blackfield" at Artclub 1563 from 1 December 2011 
 "Blackfield" at Verso Arte Contemporanea, 2010
 "Human Nature" at the Tel Aviv Museum of Art, 2009–10 
 "Blackfield" at the Shoshana Wayne Gallery, 2009 
 "Blackfield" at Annendale Galleries, 2008 
 "Four Seasons" at the Sotheby's, Hanover Square, London, 2008
 Invinsible Reality" at Guangdong Museum of Art, Guangzhou, China, 2007

Gallery

References

Further reading
 Agassi, Meir, Zadok Ben David, Motti Mizrachi. The Israeli Pavilion, The Venice Biennale 1988, Venice, 1988.
 Collins Gallery, Zadok Ben-David: Sculpture 1987–90, Glasgow, Collins Gallery, 1990.
 Edward Totah Gallery, Zadok Ben-David, London, Edward Totah Gallery, 1987.
 Hamilton, Laura, Zadok Ben-David, Glasgow, Collins Gallery, 1991.
 Mach, David, Zadok Ben David. Passage International Art Encounters Project No. 2, Tel Aviv, Chelouche Gallery for Contemporary Art, 1997

External links

 Official website
Inception Gallery website

1949 births
Living people
Alumni of Saint Martin's School of Art
Bezalel Academy of Arts and Design alumni
Israeli contemporary artists
Israeli sculptors
Jewish sculptors
Modern sculptors
People from Shabwah Governorate
Alumni of the University of Reading
Academics of Saint Martin's School of Art